Tropiphorini is a tribe of weevils in the subfamily Entiminae.

Genera 
Achorius – Adaleres – Agatholobus – Amisallus – Amnemus – Amphidees – Anametis – Baryopadus – Basedowia – Bastactes – Bolivianus – Bothynorhynchus – Brachyolus – Byrsopages – Catasarcus – Catodryobiolus – Catoptes – Cecyropa – Chaodius – Cimbocera – Cindynus – Cnemotricha – Connatichela – Crocidema – Cylindromus – Cyphometopus – Dasydema – Decienus – Derelobus – Diamimus – Dichoxenus – Dirotognathus – Dyslobus – Echinopeplus – Ecrizothis – Elytrocallus – Enchymus – Entyus – Erepsimus – Essolithna – Eurynotia – Geniocremnus – Geonemides – Hadrorhinus – Haplolobus – Hellerius – Heteractus – Heterexis – Homaleptops – Homalorhinus – Hustachius – Hybreoleptops – Inophloeus – Irenimus – Leptopinara – Leptopius – Lipothyrea – Loxorhinus – Lysizone – Malvinius – Mandalotus – Megalometides – Megalometis – Melanolemma – Micramphidees – Miloderes – Miostictus – Neoevas – Neohustachius – Nicaeana – Oclandius – Ocynoma – Odontorhinus – Onesorus – Opseotapinotus – Orimodema – Orthomycterus – Paelocharis – Panscopus – Pantomorops – Paracimbocera – Paraleptops – Paranametis – Parergus – Peripagis – Peritaxia – Perperus – Phyxelis – Piazocaulus – Polycomus – Polyphrades – Priocnemus – Protolobus – Psapharus – Pseudoleptops – Pseudomelactus – Pseudorimus – Rhigopsis – Rhyparophilus – Sargon – Sclerococcus – Scotasmus – Sepiomus – Spartecerus – Stenocorynus – Strangaliodes – Synaptonyx – Synosomus – Tetraphysus – Thesius – Thotmus – Tropiphorus – Uroleptops – Vitavitus – Vossius – Xynaea – Xyneella – Zenagraphus – Zymaus

References 

 Alonso-Zarazaga, M.A.; Lyal, C.H.C. 1999: A world catalogue of families and genera of Curculionoidea (Insecta: Coleoptera) (excepting Scolytidae and Platypodidae). Entomopraxis, Barcelona.
 Marseul, S.A. de 1863: Catalogue des Coléoptères d'Europe et du Bassin de la Méditérranée en Afrique et en Asie. Deuxième édition. Laval, Imprimerie de Mary-Beauchêne. Paris: [2] + 300 pp.
 Kuschel, G. 2008: Curculionoidea (weevils) of New Caledonia and Vanuatu: ancestral families and some Curculionidae. In: Grandcolas, P. (ed.), Zoologia Neocaledonica 6. Biodiversity studies in New Caledonia. Mémoires du Muséum national d'Histoire naturelle, 197: 99-250.

External links 

Entiminae